The 51st Writers Guild of America Awards, given in 1999, honored the film and television best writers of 1998.

Film

Best Adapted Screenplay
Out of Sight – Scott Frank
A Civil Action – Steven Zaillian
Gods and Monsters – Bill Condon
Primary Colors – Elaine May
A Simple Plan – Scott B. Smith

Best Original Screenplay
Shakespeare in Love – Marc Norman and Tom Stoppard
Bulworth – Warren Beatty and Jeremy Pikser
The Opposite of Sex – Don Roos
Saving Private Ryan – Robert Rodat
The Truman Show – Andrew Niccol

Television

Best Episodic Drama
"Proofs for The Existence of God" – Nothing Sacred  – Paul Leland
"Exodus" – ER  – Walon Green and Joe Sachs
"Apollo One" – From the Earth to the Moon  – Graham Yost
"Finnegan's Wake" – Homicide: Life on the Street  – David Mills, James Yoshimura and David Simon
"Saigon Rose" – Homicide: Life on the Street  – Eric Overmyer
"The Subway" – Homicide: Life on the Street  – James Yoshimura
"Burned" – Law & Order  – Siobhan Byrne
"Betrayal" – The Practice  – David E. Kelley
"The Marie Taquet Story" – Rescuers: Stories of Courage: Two Couples  – Cy Chermak, Francine Carroll and Malka Drucker

Best Episodic Comedy
"Frasier's Imaginary Friend" – Frasier  – Rob Greenberg
"Pilot" – Dharma & Greg  – Dottie Dartland and Chuck Lorre
"Emma" – Ellen  – Lawrence Broch
"Never Can Say Goodbye" – Murphy Brown  – Diane English

Best Long Form – Adapted 
The Love Letter – James S. Henerson
Don King: Only in America – Kario Salem
Thicker Than Blood – Bill Cain

References
WGA - Previous award winners

1998
1998 film awards
1998 television awards
1998 awards in the United States
1998 in American cinema
1998 in American television